András Haklits (born 23 September 1977) is a Croatian hammer thrower and bobsledder. He represented Hungary until July 1998.

He finished tenth at the 2006 European Athletics Championships and eighth at the 2008 Olympic Games. In addition he competed at the World Championships in 1999, 2005 and 2007 and the Olympic Games in 2000 and 2004 without reaching the final.

His personal best is 80.41 metres, achieved in May 2005 in Marietta. He worked for Doyle Sports Management whilst living in Athens, Georgia, where he graduated in economics from the University of Georgia, and he now works for Babinyecz Management in Budapest.

Since 2009, Haklits has competed as a bobsledder. At the 2010 Winter Olympics in Vancouver, he finished 20th in the four-man event. His lone event outside the Winter Olympics was at Park City, Utah in November 2009 where he finished ninth in the four-man event.

His personal best in weight throw for distance is 24.43 m.

Achievements

References

External links
 
 
 
 
 
 

1977 births
Athletes (track and field) at the 2000 Summer Olympics
Athletes (track and field) at the 2004 Summer Olympics
Athletes (track and field) at the 2008 Summer Olympics
Athletes (track and field) at the 2012 Summer Olympics
Bobsledders at the 2010 Winter Olympics
Croatian male hammer throwers
Croatian male bobsledders
Hungarian male hammer throwers
Living people
Olympic athletes of Croatia
Olympic bobsledders of Croatia
Sportspeople from Athens, Georgia
University of Georgia alumni
Sportspeople from Szombathely
World Athletics Championships athletes for Croatia
Athletes (track and field) at the 2005 Mediterranean Games
Athletes (track and field) at the 2009 Mediterranean Games
Mediterranean Games competitors for Croatia